Lupan-3β,20-diol synthase (LUP1 (gene)) is an enzyme with systematic name (3S)-2,3-epoxy-2,3-dihydrosqualene hydro-lyase (lupan-3beta,20-diol forming). This enzyme catalyses the following chemical reaction

 lupan-3β,20-diol  (3S)-2,3-epoxy-2,3-dihydrosqualene + H2O

The reaction occurs in the reverse direction.

References

External links 
 

EC 4.2.1